James Chuks Okoli (born 11 January 1976) is a retired Nigerian professional football player. He also holds Dutch citizenship.

References

1976 births
Living people
Nigerian footballers
Nigerian expatriate footballers
Expatriate footballers in Germany
FC Augsburg players
Hertha BSC II players
Expatriate footballers in Greece
Expatriate footballers in Scotland
Expatriate footballers in the Netherlands
Scottish Premier League players
Motherwell F.C. players
Dumbarton F.C. players
Expatriate footballers in England
York City F.C. players
Nigerian expatriate sportspeople in Greece
VVOG players
Association football defenders